Thomas Gilson, Jr (born November 6, 1988) is an American football wide receiver for the Jacksonville Sharks of the National Arena League (NAL). He played college football at the University of Massachusetts Amherst. He has been a member of the Lehigh Valley Steelhawks, Cleveland Gladiators, Los Angeles Kiss, Portland Steel and Washington Valor.

Early years
Gilson played high school football at Mansfield High School in Mansfield, Massachusetts. He lettered two years each at quarterback and wide receiver. He led the team to the state championship in 2003 and 2004 with a 25–0 record at quarterback. Gilson helped the team win league titles in 2005 and 2006 with a 19–2 overall record. He earned Sun Chronicle All-Star honors his junior and senior seasons. He also garnered Hockomock League All-Star recognition his senior year and was named a Brockton Enterprise All-Star as a junior. Gilson played in the Shriner's All-Star Game. He accumulated 54 receptions for 1,154 yards and a school-record 15 touchdowns in his two years as a wide receiver. He was a team captain for the basketball team his senior year. Gilson was also a state qualifier in the triple jump and 4 × 100 metres relay in track and field.

College career
Gilson played for the UMass Minutemen from 2008 to 2011. He was redshirted in 2007. He won the team's Outstanding Offensive Scout Team Player award in 2008. Gilson caught 39 passes for 446 yards as a senior in 2011. He graduated from UMass with a bachelor's degree in kinesiology.

Professional career

Lehigh Valley Steelhawks
Gilson played for the Lehigh Valley Steelhawks of the Professional Indoor Football League (PIFL) in 2013. He was named the PIFL Offensive Rookie of the Year after recording 93 receptions for 946 yards and 19 touchdowns during the regular season. He caught six passes for 91 yards and three touchdowns against the Richmond Raiders in the first round of the playoffs. Gilson also earned Second Team All-PIFL honors.

Cleveland Gladiators
Gilson was assigned to the AFL's Cleveland Gladiators on July 25, 2013. He recorded three receptions for 42 yards and a touchdown in five games for the Gladiators during the 2014 regular season. He caught three passes for 25 yards and a touchdown in the Gladiators' 56–46 win over the Orlando Predators in the American Conference Championship game on August 10, 2014. Gilson then played in ArenaBowl XXVII, a 72–32 loss to the Arizona Rattlers.

Los Angeles Kiss
Gilson was assigned to the Los Angeles Kiss of the AFL on October 28, 2014. He recorded 53 receptions for 549 yards and seven touchdowns in seventeen games for the Kiss in 2015.

Portland Steel
Gilson was assigned to the Portland Thunder of the AFL on February 9, 2016. On February 24, 2016, the franchise changed its name from Thunder to Steel. He caught 132 passes for 1,303 yards and 14 touchdowns in 2016.

Washington Valor
Gilson was assigned to the Washington Valor on February 20, 2017. On March 31, 2017, Gilson was placed on recallable reassignment.

Cleveland Gladiators
On May 26, 2017, Gilson was assigned to the Cleveland Gladiators. On May 27, he refused to report. On June 1, he was activated. Gilson played in 5 games, starting 4, in 2017, catching 18 passes for 200 yards and 1 touchdown.

Coaching career
Gilson has spent time as the wide receivers coach at Santa Ana College and Mount Ida College.

References

External links
Just Sports Stats

Living people
1988 births
American football wide receivers
Mansfield High School alumni
UMass Minutemen football players
Lehigh Valley Steelhawks players
Cleveland Gladiators players
Los Angeles Kiss players
Portland Thunder players
Portland Steel players
Washington Valor players
Junior college football coaches in the United States
Mount Ida Mustangs football coaches
Players of American football from Massachusetts
People from Mansfield, Massachusetts
Jacksonville Sharks players